The Battle of Camp Canini was fought between the Alemanni and the Western Roman Empire in 457. Taking advantage of the confusion after the defeat of Emperor Avitus at Placentia on 16 October 456, an Alemannic army crossed the Rhaetian Alps through Switzerland into Italy, reaching Lake Maggiore. At nearby Campi Cannini, the Alemanni were defeated by the Roman general Majorian. With the help of his Suebian ally Ricimer, Majorian was later proclaimed Roman emperor.

Sources
 

457
Campi Cannini
Campi Cannini
Military history of Italy
Campi Cannini